Langvatnet is a lake in the municipality of Rana in Nordland county, Norway.  The  lake lies just northwest of the town of Mo i Rana.  The lake flows out into the river Langvassåga just north of Mo i Rana Airport, Røssvoll.  The lake used as a reservoir for the Langvatn hydroelectric power plant in the village of Ytteren, just down the hill from the lake.

See also
 List of lakes in Norway
 Geography of Norway

References

External links

Lakes of Nordland
Rana, Norway